Wim Steijn (28 January 1914, Assendelft – 23 August 1980, Bentveld), was a Dutch painter.

Biography

Steijn first received training from Henk Gorter in Amsterdam before moving to Haarlem in 1935.

According to the RKD he was a pupil of Henri Boot in 1937 and then studied two years under Kees Verweij. Steijn's work was included in the 1939 exhibition and sale Onze Kunst van Heden (Our Art of Today) at the Rijksmuseum in Amsterdam. He lived and worked in Assendelft, Oostzaan, Jisp and Wormer. After the war he met and married Janna Koolman, who worked for Henriëtte Louise Posthuma, the owner of the estate Groot Bentveld. He lived with her in one of the side wings of the estate where he kept his workshop.

In 1969 he was a member of the Haarlem artist society "De Groep", the Amsterdam Arti et Amicitiae, "Nederlandse Kring van Tekenaars", "De Keerkring", and "Beroepsvereniging van Beeldende Kunstenaars"(BBK) He signed his works "WSTEYN".

References

External links
Wim Steijn on website "Haarlemse Kunstschilders"

1914 births
1980 deaths
People from Zaanstad
20th-century Dutch painters
Dutch male painters
20th-century Dutch male artists